Bertrand Mandico is a French experimental film director of short films, medium-length films, experimental essays, and two feature films. The Wild Boys, his first feature film, was named the top film of 2018 by Cahiers du cinéma. His films are often interested in the body and gender fluidity and incorporate photos and written elements.

Born in 1971 in Toulouse, Mandico graduated from the film directing program at the Gobelins school in Paris.

Mandico has an unusual working method. He prefers to create the audio for his films in post-production. Actors post-synchronize themselves, and the environmental sounds and music are layered on. However, he always shoots his images on color film, with no post-production images. Background projection and superimposition are done during the shoot.

He created the Incoherence Manifesto in 2012 with Icelandic filmmaker Katrín Ólafsdóttir. He states that To be incoherent means to have faith in cinema, it means to have a romantic approach, unformatted, free, disturbed and dreamlike, cinegenic, an epic narration.A group of young filmmakers including  Yann Gonzales, Caroline Poggi and Jonathan Vinel have been influenced by the manifesto.

Mandico has commenced "20+1 Projections", a collaborative project with Romanian-American actress Elina Löwensohn, where they are to make 21 short films in 21 years. Though each film is meant to be a unique narrative and formal work, they are to revolve around the themes of aging and desire. As of 2018, they've shot 8 films and completed 6 of them.

He was named best director at the Vilnius International Film Festival in 2018 for The Wild Boys.

Selected filmography 
Mandico has directed 40 short films, TV-commercials and musical films.

 Le cavalier bleu (1998, short)
 Tout ce que vous avez vu est vrai (2006, short)
 Essai 135 (2007, short)
 Il dit qu'il est mort (2008, short)
 Mie, l’enfant descend du songe (2009, short)
 Sa majesté petite barbe (2010, short)
 Lif og daudi Henry Darger (2011, short)
 Boro in the Box (2011, short)
 S... Sa... Salam... Sallammbô (2012, short)
 Living Still Life (2012, short)
 Prehistoric Cabaret (2013, short)
 Notre Dame des hormones (2014, short)
 Y’a-t-il une vierge encore vivante? (2015, short)
 Souvenirs d'un montreur de seins (2016, short)
 Depressive Cop (2016, short)
 The Wild Boys (2017)
 After Blue (2021)

External links 

Mubi article about Mandico's influences
Interview with Extra Extra Magazine

References 

1971 births
Living people
Mass media people from Toulouse
French film directors